Bengt Axel Bergt (born 7 May 1982) is a German politician of the Social Democratic Party (SPD) who was elected the member of the Bundestag for Segeberg – Stormarn-Mitte in the 2021 German federal election.

Early life and career
Bergt was born in Luckenwalde.

From 2015 to 2021, Bergt worked for Nordex. During that time, he served as deputy chair of the works council and as chair of the European Works Council from 2020 to 2021.

Political career
Bergt became a member of the German Bundestag in the 2021 German federal election, representing the Segeberg – Stormarn-Mitte district. In parliament, he has since been serving on the Committee on Climate Action and Energy and the Committee on Petitions. 

Within his parliamentary group, Bergt belongs to the Parliamentary Left, a left-wing movement.

Other activities
 Federal Network Agency for Electricity, Gas, Telecommunications, Post and Railway (BNetzA), Alternate Member of the Advisory Board (since 2022)
 German Industry Initiative for Energy Efficiency (DENEFF), Member of the Parliamentary Advisory Board

Personal life
Bergt was a drummer in a punk band.

References 

1982 births
Living people
Members of the Bundestag for the Social Democratic Party of Germany

Members of the Bundestag 2021–2025
Members of the Bundestag for Schleswig-Holstein
21st-century German politicians
German drummers
People from Luckenwalde